Pura may refer to:

Places
 Pura, Kushtagi, a village in Koppal district, Karnataka, India
 Pura, Iran, a village in Mazandaran Province, Iran
 Pura, Tarlac, a municipality in the Philippines 
 Pura, Switzerland, a municipality in Ticino, Switzerland
 Pura, Chikmagalur, a settlement in Chikmagalur district, Karnataka, India
 Pura, Pakistan, ancient capital of Gedrosia present Balochistan

People 
 Pura (given name) (including a list of people)
 Stela Pura (born 1971), Romanian retired swimmer

Other uses
 PURA, a human protein
 Pura (album), an album by Mortal
 Pura (placename element), a placename suffix used in South Asia
 Pura (Balinese temple)
 Pura (Crash Bandicoot), a character from Crash Bandicoot
 Providing Urban Amenities to Rural Areas (PURA), a rural development strategy in India

See also
 Pura māku, a Japanese recycling symbol
Puro (disambiguation)